CWP Renewables is an Australian developer and owner of renewable energy systems such as wind farms and solar farms. It was established in 2007 as a joint venture of Continental Wind Partners and Wind Prospect. It was later majority owned by venture capital group PostScriptum.

In December 2022, CWP Renewables was acquired from Partners Group by Squadron Energy, owned by Tattarang which belongs to Andrew Forrest's family.

Power generators
CWP Renewables owns and manages several facilities in Australia. Some are owned by Grassroots Renewable Energy Platform, a joint venture with Partners Group private investment managers.

...and several other wind and solar projects not yet started construction.

References

2022 mergers and acquisitions
Renewable energy companies of Australia